Herbert Kiesel (10 December 1931 – 14 December 2015) was a Swiss bobsledder. He competed in the two-man and the four-man events at the 1964 Winter Olympics.

References

1931 births
2015 deaths
Swiss male bobsledders
Olympic bobsledders of Switzerland
Bobsledders at the 1964 Winter Olympics
Sportspeople from Zürich
20th-century Swiss people